Tegula aureotincta, common name the gilded tegula, is a species of sea snail, a marine gastropod mollusk in the family Tegulidae.

Description
The size of the shell varies between 20 mm and 40 mm. The shell is broad and low. The spire feels rough. Its sculpture consists of low, spiral ridges, especially on the body whorl and of diagonal ridges. The color of the spire is  dark gray or olive. The base of the shell has a bright yellow or orange skin around the deep umbilicus.

Distribution
This species occurs in the Pacific Ocean in the low intertidal zones and on adjacent rocky subtidal shores off Southern California, USA and Mexico

References

External links
 To Biodiversity Heritage Library (13 publications)
 To GenBank (5 nucleotides; 4 proteins)
 To USNM Invertebrate Zoology Mollusca Collection
 
 CBRISC: Tegula aureotincta
 Intertidal Invertebrates of California

aureotincta
Gastropods described in 1850